Museum store may refer to:

 Museum shop, a shop at a museum
 Museum store, storage of a museum collection
 Museum Store Company